Westpac Rescue Helicopter can refer to:
 Westpac Life Saver Rescue Helicopter Service, Australia
 Westpac Rescue Helicopter (New Zealand), New Zealand